Tim Walbrecht (born 18 September 2001) is a German footballer who plays as a defensive midfielder or centre-back for Hannover 96.

References

2001 births
Living people
German footballers
People from Celle
Footballers from Lower Saxony
Association football midfielders
Association football defenders
Hannover 96 II players
SV Wehen Wiesbaden players
Regionalliga players
3. Liga players